Eva Maria Simons (born 27 April 1984) is a Dutch singer-songwriter from Amsterdam. She is best known for her song "Policeman" and collaborations with artists such as Afrojack; in 2012, Simons broke through internationally after being featured on the will.i.am single "This Is Love". During her solo career she has released 12 singles, including "Bludfire" which appeared in November 2015.

Biography

Early life
Raised in Amsterdam, Simons grew up in a family of musicians. Her mother is Ingrid Simons, a Dutch backing-singer and vocalist of Surinamese origin, who worked with DJ Paul Elstak and T-Spoon. Her grandfather was Dutch accordionist Johnny Meijer; her father was a pianist who inspired her to take up the instrument. In her early teens she was part of Jody's Kids, an ensemble that provided vocals for production music. She is a graduate from the Conservatorium van Amsterdam. In 2001 she sang on the single "I Believe in Love" by Cooper. After graduating in 2004 she entered the Dutch version of the Popstars The Rivals competition, where she was selected as one of the five members of the band Raffish. The five-piece had a hit-single with "Plaything" and released the album How Raffish Are You? in January 2005. Two further singles from the album failed to replicate the success and over the course of the summer of the same year, Simons announced that she was leaving the group.

2009–present
In 2009, a demo of Simons' song "Silly Boy" was leaked on YouTube generating 4 million views. It caused a degree of confusion as some mistook it for an unreleased single by Lady Gaga or Rihanna. Upon confirming her authorship, she signed an initial contract with EMI for the release of the single.

In mid-2010, Eva and Mike Hamilton (also known as the writing team Topline Ink) wrote the song “Take Over Control”. They played the idea to DJ Afrojack, who produced the hit single, which spent 6 weeks on the Billboard Top Dance Airplay Chart, topped iTunes dance charts globally, and gained Platinum status in Australia and certified Gold in the US. The song became a globally dance crossover anthem, propelling the profiles of both Eva and Afrojack worldwide.

In 2011, as well as touring across the globe, Simons went on to sign a major label US deal, and was featured on LMFAO's track "Best Night". In addition to this, she also collaborated with will.i.am on tracks for his solo album #willpower.

On 20 March 2012 Simons premiered her new single, "I Don't Like You", which was released in most countries on 26 March under Interscope Records, USA. The track is produced by Zedd. In May 2012, she joined LMFAO in their North American "Sorry For Party Rocking" tour. On 24 July 2012 Simons released her second single, "Renegade", produced by J.O.B. On 14 May 2012 will.i.am premiered his new single "This Is Love" which features Simons' vocals. The song went on to become number 1 in multiple countries including the UK, and a top 10 hit in many other countries. In October of the same year Simons received a BMI Songwriting Award for "Take Over Control".

On 21 and 22 April 2013, Simons supported Beyoncé on The Mrs. Carter Show World Tour in the Netherlands. Shortly after that was announced in March, Pepsi launched an ad campaign in the Netherlands giving customers a chance to meet Simons when she performed at Beyoncé's tour. A song by Simons named 'Chemistry' used in the advert was released in the Netherlands 22 March 2013.

On 28 January 2014 Simons released a 'bootleg' remix of the Martin Garrix track "Animals". In June 2014 she married her longtime partner Sidney Samson in Amsterdam. That summer Simons also made her acting debut in the Dutch-language film Heksen Bestaan Niet aimed at the adolescent market.

On 10 April 2015 Simons released the single titled 'Policeman' through Powerhouse Music, a dancehall song produced by Sidney Samson. It was supported by a video directed by Rigel Kilston. On 23 November 2015 Simons released the single titled Bludfire (feat. Sidney Samson) that received airplay on the Dutch radio stations Radio 538 and SLAM!.

Simons released the single "Guaya" via the label Powerhouse Music on 17 July 2017. On 6 April 2018, Simons released her single titled "The One" via 8ball Music, which was produced by Boaz van de Beatz and Ruud van Schaik. 25 January 2019 saw Simons release her single "Like That" on the dance label Spinnin' Records. She performed the song live for the first time on RTL Late Night.

Discography

Albums

Singles

Other appearances

Tours
Opening act
Sorry For Party Rocking Tour (2012)
The Mrs. Carter Show World Tour (2013)
Purpose World Tour (2016)

Awards and nominations

Notes

References

External links

1984 births
Dutch dance musicians
Dutch people of Surinamese descent
Dutch pop singers
English-language singers from the Netherlands
Living people
Musicians from Amsterdam
21st-century Dutch singers
21st-century Dutch women singers
Women in electronic music
Spanish-language singers of the Netherlands